The Puzzle of the Red Orchid and also known as The Secret of the Red Orchid) is a 1962 West German black-and-white crime film directed by Helmut Ashley and starring Christopher Lee, Adrian Hoven, and Marisa Mell.

It was made as part of the long-running series of Edgar Wallace adaptations made by Rialto Film. It was made at the Wandsbek Studios in Hamburg with location shooting in London and around the harbor at Cuxhaven.

Cast

Reception
The FSK gave the film a rating of "12 and older" and found it not appropriate for screenings on public holidays. The film went on mass release on 1 March 1962.

References

External links

1962 films
1960s mystery films
1960s crime thriller films
German mystery films
German crime thriller films
West German films
1960s German-language films
German black-and-white films
Films based on British novels
Films based on works by Edgar Wallace
Films set in England
Films produced by Horst Wendlandt
Films set in Chicago
Films set in London
Constantin Film films
Films shot at Wandsbek Studios
1960s German films